Fatehnagar is a Town and a municipality in Udaipur district  in the state of Rajasthan, India.

Demographics
 India census, Fatehnagar had a population of 19,624. Males constitute 51% of the population and females 49%. Fatehnagar has an average literacy rate of 60%, higher than the national average of 59.5%: male literacy is 71%, and female literacy is 48%. In Fatehnagar, 14% of the population is under 6 years of age.

References

Cities and towns in Udaipur district